Into the Skyline is the second studio album by English dance artist Cathy Dennis, released in September 1992 in North America, and January 1993 in the UK. Written with an aim toward the US market, the album features the singles "You Lied to Me", "Irresistible", "Moments of Love", "Falling", and "Why" – the latter was credited to D Mob with Cathy Dennis. The album peaked at number 8 in the UK Albums Chart, whilst on the US Billboard Hot 100, "You Lied to Me" was a Top 40 hit, and "Irresistible" made the Adult Contemporary top ten; however, the album descended the chart rapidly.

Dennis experienced a brief peak of fame, making a cameo in Beverly Hills, 90210 singing the song "Moments of Love" (a minor US Adult Contemporary chart hit), "Why" (in the episode, without D Mob) and "Touch Me (All Night Long)", a single from her previous album, Move to This. The Japanese edition of Into the Skyline had a second release, which was called Into the Skyline +1, and featured three extra tracks: "Nothing Moves Me", a previous B-side, and "It's My Style" were released as singles.

Track listing

Personnel
Cathy Dennis – backing vocals on tracks 1, 6, 7, 8 and 12; keyboards on tracks 4, 5, 9 to 11
Cindy Mizelle – backing vocals on tracks 1, 6, 7 and 12
Craig Derry – backing vocals on tracks 1, 6, 7 and 12
Roberta Gilliam – backing vocals on tracks 1, 6 and 12
Sonset – backing vocals on tracks 2, 9 and 11
Robin Hancock – engineer on tracks 4, 5, 9, 10 and 11
Alan Jenkins – assistant engineer on tracks 4, 5, 9 to 11
Alan Gregorie – mixing engineer on tracks 4 to 6
Bonzai Jim Caruso – mixing engineer on tracks 1, 8 and 12
P. Dennis Mitchell – recording engineer on tracks 1, 3, 6, 7, 8 and 12
Paul Gendler – guitar on tracks 4, 5, 9 and 10
Terry Burrus – keyboards on tracks 1, 6 and 12
Mixing – Cathy Dennis (tracks 7, 9 to 11), Shep Pettibone (tracks 1 to 4)
Producer – Cathy Dennis (tracks 1, 3 to 12), Shep Pettibone (tracks 1, 3 to 12)
Programming, keyboards – Scott Davidson (tracks 5, 9 to 11)
Sequencing, keyboards, programming – Shep Pettibone (tracks 1, 3, 6 to 8, 12), Tony Shimkin (tracks 1, 3, 6 to 8, 12)

Additional personnel
Cathy Dennis – vocals, keyboard and programming
Shep Pettibone – keyboard and programming
Zanna – photography

Charts

References

1992 albums
Cathy Dennis albums
Polydor Records albums